Feng Yuanzheng (born November 16, 1962 in Beijing) is a Chinese actor.

Selected filmography
1995: Postman
1998: Records of Kangxi's Travel Incognito
2003: Purple Butterfly
2004: A World Without Thieves
2004: Shanghai Story
2008: If You Are the One
2009: The Founding of a Republic
2011: The Founding of a Party
2011: Legend of a Rabbit (voice)
2012: Back to 1942
2012: The Next 11 Days
2013: Fall of Ming
2014: Red Amnesia
2016: The Bombing
2017: Six Years, Six Days

References
司徒雷登秘书 冯远征 饰

External links

Chinese male film actors
Chinese male television actors
Chinese male voice actors
21st-century Chinese male actors
20th-century Chinese male actors
Male actors from Beijing
Members of the 13th Chinese People's Political Consultative Conference
1962 births
Living people